The Village Lanterne is the fifth studio album by the group Blackmore's Night, released on Steamhammer US on 4 April 2006. It featured the single "Just Call My Name (I'll Be There)".

The song "Olde Mill Inn" was included as soundtrack in the 2008 movie Yes Man.

Track listing

Bonus tracks

Personnel
 Ritchie Blackmore – electric guitars, acoustic guitars, various drums, hurdy-gurdy
 Candice Night – lead vocals, backing vocals, shawms, rauchpfeife, recorder, chanters
 Pat Regan and the Minstrel Hall Consort – keyboards
 Sir Robert of Normandie (Robert Curiano) – bass
 Sisters of the Moon: Lady Madeline and Lady Nancy (Madeline and Nancy Posner) – harmony vocals
 Bard David of Larchmont (David Baranowski) – keyboards
 Sarah Steiding – violin
 Anton Fig – drums
 Albert Dannemann – bagpipes, backing vocals
 Ian Robertson and Jim Manngard – backing vocals
 Joe Lynn Turner – guest vocals on the bonus version of "Street of Dreams"

Charts

Certifications

References

External links
 Lyrics at Blackmore's Night official site

2006 albums
Blackmore's Night albums
SPV/Steamhammer albums